UFC Fight Night: Costa vs. Vettori (also known as UFC Fight Night 196, UFC Vegas 41 and UFC on ESPN+ 54) was a mixed martial arts event produced by the Ultimate Fighting Championship that took place on October 23, 2021 at the UFC Apex facility in Enterprise, Nevada, part of the Las Vegas Metropolitan Area, United States.

Background
A middleweight bout between former UFC Middleweight Championship title challengers Paulo Costa and Marvin Vettori headlined the event. In the days leading up to the event, the bout was shifted to a catchweight of 195 lbs and then ultimately to light heavyweight due to weight cut issues with Costa. As a result, he forfeited 20% of his fight purse to Vettori.

Aaron Phillips and Kris Moutinho was scheduled for the bantamweight bout at the event. However in mid-September, Moutinho was removed from the bout for undisclosed reasons and was replaced by Jonathan Martinez. In turn, Philips withdrew from the bout due to illness. On three days notice, promotional newcomer Zviad Lazishvili stepped in as a replacement.

A welterweight bout between Dwight Grant and Gabriel Green was briefly linked to the event. However, Green was removed from the contest in late September due to undisclosed reasons and replaced by Francisco Trinaldo.

A middleweight bout between Jamie Pickett and Laureano Staropoli was originally expected to take place at UFC Fight Night: Dern vs. Rodriguez, but it was moved to this event after one of Pickett's coaches tested positive for COVID-19.

A lightweight rematch between Alan Patrick and Mason Jones was expected to take place at the event. The pairing previously met at UFC Fight Night: Rozenstruik vs. Sakai, which ended in a no contest when an accidental eye poke rendered Patrick unable to continue. However in late October, Patrick withdrew from bout and he was replaced by newcomer David Onama.

Results

Bonus awards
The following fighters received $50,000 bonuses.
 Fight of the Night: Gregory Rodrigues vs. Jun Yong Park 
 Performance of the Night:  Marvin Vettori and Alex Caceres

See also 

 List of UFC events
 List of current UFC fighters
 2021 in UFC

References 

UFC Fight Night
2021 in mixed martial arts
October 2021 sports events in the United States
2021 in sports in Nevada
Mixed martial arts in Las Vegas
Sports competitions in Las Vegas